Litky may refer to the following places in Ukraine:

Litky, Khmelnytskyi Oblast, village in Khmelnytskyi Raion
Litky, Kyiv Oblast, village in Brovary Raion
Litky, Zhytomyr Oblast, village in Korosten Raion